Roger Cuthbert Wakefield CMG, OBE, FRICS (27 June 1906 – 1 July 1986) was a prominent English surveyor, former director of the British Sudan Survey department, and an early twentieth century rugby union international who is known as one of the "lost lions"  due to his participation on the 1927 British Lions tour to Argentina which, although retrospectively recognised as a Lions tour, did not confer test status on any of the four encounters with the Argentina national rugby union team.

Early life
Wakefield was born at Cark in 1906, the youngest son of Roger William Wakefield, a medical doctor, and Ethel Mary (née Knott). He was the brother of Sir Edward Wakefield, 1st Baronet, a Conservative politician and Wavell Wakefield who became a rugby union international, captaining England, and later a politician and eventually 1st Baron Wakefield of Kendal. Like his elder brother, he attended Sedbergh School in the West Riding of Yorkshire (now part of Cumbria). He then went on to Trinity College, Cambridge.

Rugby career
Like his brother, Roger played rugby at Sedbergh, a school renowned for its prowess in the sport. At Cambridge he gained his blue and it was from here that he was selected for the 1927 tour to Argentina. On this tour he was one of a number of uncapped players but only one of two players not selected to play in any of the tests. Despite being selected for the Great Britain side, he never went on to play for his national side.

Career
RC Wakefield played a significant part in the history of British survey. He also directed the modernisation of the Sudan Survey Department.

Personal and later life
He married Elizabeth Rhoda Wakefield, born Davie, in 1936. He died on 1 July 1986, aged 80.

References

1906 births
1986 deaths
Alumni of Trinity College, Cambridge
British & Irish Lions rugby union players from England
Cambridge University R.U.F.C. players
Companions of the Order of St Michael and St George
English rugby union players
English surveyors
Harlequin F.C. players
Officers of the Order of the British Empire
People educated at Sedbergh School
Rugby union players from Ulverston
Rugby union forwards